U.S. Route 62 (US 62) is a United States Numbered Highway spanning through Ohio from Aberdeen to Hubbard. Near Killbuck, in Amish Country, it is also marked as an Ohio Byway.

Route description

US 62 enters Ohio from Kentucky, crossing the Ohio River at Aberdeen. After the river crossing, the highway follows US 52 until Ripley and US 68 until just east of Georgetown. From there, US 62 enters the towns of Russellville, Hillsboro, and Washington Court House. In Washington Court House, US 62 meets up with State Route 3 (SR 3) and continues all the way into Columbus, passing through the towns of Mount Sterling, Orient, Harrisburg, and Grove City. After heading toward downtown Columbus, US 62 diverts from SR 3 onto US 40 (Broad Street) for a few blocks to Nelson Road. US 62 runs concurrently with Interstate 670 (I-670) near John Glenn Columbus International Airport until the eastern side of I-270 where US 62 heads toward Gahanna, New Albany, Johnstown, Utica, Millersburg, and Navarre. The highway passes West Lawn Cemetery and the President William McKinley memorial and tomb in Canton. At exit 107B on I-77, US 62 heads northeast to Alliance. US 62's departure from Alliance then heads east toward Salem and Canfield. 

Crossing into a more suburban landscape in a northeast direction, before Youngstown, US 62 enters the Cornersburg neighborhood. Leaving Cornersburg, US 62 dips into Mill Creek Park. US 62 is carried over Mill Creek by a historic open-spandrel arch bridge built in 1920. Immediately after this bridge, US 62 passes through the historic Idora Park neighborhood, before continuing on a more northward track toward Downtown Youngstown. It leaves Ohio near Hubbard and enters Pennsylvania near the interchange for I-80.

Future
In Ohio, there are plans to reroute US 62 onto a divided highway from Alliance to Salem, part of a larger relocation of both US 62 and SR 14, then from downtown Youngstown to I-80 as part of the "Hubbard Arterial". Parts of the highway have long been completed to the north of Alliance and Salem; the portion northwest of Alliance is known in documents as US 62T, while the portion north of Salem not already carrying US 62 is known as SR 14T; neither carries a posted route, instead only carrying trailblazer markers indicating routes intersected at the termini.

Based on costs and environmental impacts, ODOT decided in 2018 not to extent US 62T to SR 11 in 2018.

Major junctions

Related routes

Alliance temporary route

U.S. Route 62 Temporary (US 62T) is a  bypass around the city of Alliance. US 62T, a four-lane highway, begins at US 62 (Atlantic Boulevard NE/State Street) in Stark County. US 62T then has a highway ramp at Beeson Street. Exit ramps provide access from US 62T to Beeson St NE, and then the highway merges onto State Route 225 (SR 225) and ends.

Although the US 62T designation is unsigned, signs on the road read "To West US 62 / To State Route 225 North".

US 62T is planned to extend to Youngstown by 2030.

Based on costs and environmental impacts, ODOT decided in 2018 not to extent US 62T to SR 11 in 2018.

See also

Special routes of U.S. Route 62

References

External links

62
 Ohio
Scenic byways in Ohio
Transportation in Brown County, Ohio
Transportation in Highland County, Ohio
Transportation in Fayette County, Ohio
Transportation in Madison County, Ohio
Transportation in Pickaway County, Ohio
Transportation in Franklin County, Ohio
Transportation in Licking County, Ohio
Transportation in Knox County, Ohio
Transportation in Holmes County, Ohio
Transportation in Stark County, Ohio
Transportation in Columbiana County, Ohio
Transportation in Mahoning County, Ohio
Transportation in Trumbull County, Ohio